Dennis Scholes (August 1928 – January 2016) was a professional rugby league footballer who played in the 1940s, 1950s and 1960s.

Playing career
Dennis Scholes was signed by Hull Kingston Rovers during 1946, he made his début for Hull Kingston Rovers against Liverpool Stanley at Old Craven Park, Kingston upon Hull during December 1947, he was transferred from Hull Kingston Rovers to Leeds (having scored a hat-trick of tries against Leeds two-weeks earlier) during November 1951 for a transfer fee of £4,000 (based on increases in average earnings, this would be approximately £305,100 in 2017). he was transferred from Leeds to Featherstone Rovers, he made his début for Featherstone Rovers on Saturday 15 September 1956, and he played his last match for Featherstone Rovers during the 1957–58 season, he was transferred from Featherstone Rovers to Hull Kingston Rovers, he was one of new coach; Colin Hutton's first signings, he played his last match for Hull Kingston Rovers against York at Old Craven Park, Kingston upon Hull on Friday 26 December 1958, and he was transferred from Hull Kingston Rovers to Doncaster, he appears to have scored no drop-goals (or field-goals as they are currently known in Australasia), but prior to the 1974–75 season all goals, whether; conversions, penalties, or drop-goals, scored 2-points, consequently prior to this date drop-goals were often not explicitly documented, therefore '0' drop-goals may indicate drop-goals not recorded, rather than no drop-goals scored.

County League appearances
Dennis Scholes played in Leeds' victory in the Yorkshire County League during the 1954–55 season.

Genealogical information
Dennis Scholes' marriage to Sylvia (née Clayton) was registered during third ¼ 1952 in Hull district. They had children; Gillian Scholes birth registered during second ¼  in Holderness district), and Wendy Scholes birth registered during first ¼  in Hull district).

References

External links
Search for "Scholes" at rugbyleagueproject.org
Cyril Woolford
Bill Hudson 1956 to 1957
Peter Fox January 1971 to June 1974.
Search for "Dennis Scholes" at britishnewspaperarchive.co.uk
Search for "Denis Scholes" at britishnewspaperarchive.co.uk

1928 births
2016 deaths
Doncaster R.L.F.C. players
English rugby league players
Featherstone Rovers players
Hull Kingston Rovers players
Leeds Rhinos players
Place of birth missing
Place of death missing
Rugby league fullbacks
Rugby league second-rows
Rugby league utility players